Mr. Jones at the Ball is a 1908 American silent short comedy film directed by D. W. Griffith.

Cast
 John R. Cumpson as Mr. Jones
 Florence Lawrence as Mrs. Jones
 Mack Sennett as Butler / Policeman
 George Gebhardt as Man in Blackface / Guest at Ball
 Charles Inslee as Guest at Ball
 Arthur V. Johnson as Guest
 Jeanie MacPherson as Guest at Ball
 Harry Solter as Guest at Ball
 Marion Sunshine as Guest

References

External links
 

1908 films
1908 comedy films
Silent American comedy films
American silent short films
American black-and-white films
Films directed by D. W. Griffith
1908 short films
American comedy short films
1900s American films